Philip V (19 December 1683 – 9 July 1746) was King of Spain from 1 November 1700 to 14 January 1724, and again from 6 September 1724 to his death in 1746. His total reign of 44 years is the longest in the history of the Spanish monarchy surpassing Philip II. Philip instigated many important reforms in Spain, most especially the centralization of power of the monarchy and the suppression of regional privileges, via the Nueva Planta decrees, and restructuring of the administration of the Spanish Empire on the Iberian peninsula and its overseas regions.

Philip was born into the French royal family (as Philippe, Duke of Anjou) during the reign of his grandfather, King Louis XIV. He was the second son of Louis, Grand Dauphin, and was third in line to the French throne after his father and his elder brother, Louis, Duke of Burgundy. Philip was not expected to become a monarch, but his great-uncle Charles II of Spain was childless. Philip's father had a strong claim to the Spanish throne, but since Philip's father and elder brother were expected to inherit the French throne, King Charles named Philip as his heir presumptive in his will. He ascended the Spanish throne in 1700. Philip was the first member of the House of Bourbon to rule as King of Spain. It was well-known that the union of France and Spain under one monarch would upset the balance of power in Europe, and that other European powers would take steps to prevent it. Philip's accession in Spain provoked the 13-year War of the Spanish Succession, which continued until the Treaty of Utrecht forbade any future possibility of unifying the French and Spanish crowns while confirming his accession to the throne of Spain. It also removed the Spanish Netherlands and Spanish-controlled territories in Italy from the Spanish monarchy. In 1724, Philip abdicated in favor of his eldest son, Louis. The new king died later that year, and Philip took the throne again. As a result of his depression, his wife Elisabeth Farnese held control over the Spanish government. When Philip died in 1746, he was succeeded by his son Ferdinand VI.

Phillip's reign has been generally criticized by historians, though some praise is occasionally offered for his reforms. Historian Stanley G. Payne wrote that "Felipe V was a neurotic, vacillating ruler, concerned with outward decorum and brave only in battle. He had little sense of Spanish interests and needs."

Early years

Birth and family

Philip was born on 19 December 1683 at the Palace of Versailles in France, the second son of Louis, Grand Dauphin, the heir apparent to the throne of France, and his wife Maria Anna Victoria of Bavaria, known as the Dauphine Victoire. His father was the eldest son of Louis XIV of France and Maria Theresa of Spain.

Philip was a younger brother of Louis, Duke of Burgundy, the father of Louis XV of France. At birth, Philip was created Duke of Anjou, a traditional title for younger sons in the French royal family. He would be known by this name until he became the King of Spain. Since Philip's older brother, the Duke of Burgundy, was second in line to the French throne after his father, there was little expectation that either he or his younger brother Charles, Duke of Berry, would ever rule over France.

Upbringing and education
Philip lived his first years under the supervision of the royal governess Louise de Prie and after that was tutored with his brothers by François Fénelon, Archbishop of Cambrai. The three were also educated by Paul de Beauvilliers.

Claims to the Spanish throne

In 1700, King Charles II of Spain, the last Habsburg to rule Spain, died childless. His will named as successor Philip, grandson of Charles' half-sister Maria Theresa, the first wife of Louis XIV. Upon any possible refusal, the crown of Spain would be offered next to Philip's younger brother, the Duke of Berry, then to the Archduke Charles of Austria, later Holy Roman Emperor Charles VI. Philip had the better genealogical claim to the Spanish throne, because his Spanish grandmother and great-grandmother were older than the ancestors of the Archduke Charles of Austria. However, the Austrians maintained that Philip's grandmother had renounced the Spanish throne for herself and her descendants as part of her marriage contract. That renunciation was contingent on her dowry being paid. The French claim to Spain was due to the dowry having never been paid.

After a long Royal Council meeting in France at which the Dauphin spoke up in favor of his son's rights, it was agreed that Philip would ascend the throne, but he would forever renounce his claim to the throne of France for himself and his descendants. The Royal Council decided to accept the provisions of the will of Charles II naming Philip, King of Spain, and the Spanish ambassador was called in and introduced to the new king. The ambassador, along with his son, knelt before Philip and made a long speech in Spanish, which Philip did not understand. (Louis XIV, the son and husband of Spanish princesses, did speak Spanish, but Philip learned only later.)

First marriage
On 2 November 1701, the almost 18-year-old Philip married the 13-year-old Maria Luisa of Savoy, as chosen by his grandfather King Louis XIV. She was the daughter of Victor Amadeus II, Duke of Savoy, and his wife Anne Marie d'Orléans, Philip's first cousin once removed.  The Duke and Duchess of Savoy were also the parents of Princess Marie Adélaïde of Savoy, Duchess of Burgundy, Philip's sister-in-law. There was a proxy ceremony at Turin, the capital of the Duchy of Savoy, and another one at Versailles on 11 September.

Maria Luisa proved very popular as Queen of Spain. She served as regent for her husband on several occasions. Her most successful term was when Philip was away touring his Italian domains for nine months in 1702, when she was just 14 years old. On entering Naples that year he was presented with Bernini's Boy with a Dragon by Carlo Barberini. In 1714, Maria Luisa died at the age of 26 from tuberculosis, a devastating emotional blow to her husband.

War of the Spanish Succession

The actions of Louis XIV heightened the fears of the English, the Dutch and the Austrians, among others.  In February 1701, Louis XIV caused the Parlement of Paris (a court) to register a decree that if Philip's elder brother, the Petit Dauphin Louis, died without an heir, then Philip would surrender the throne of Spain for the succession to the throne of France, ensuring dynastic continuity in Europe's greatest land power.

However, a second act of the French king "justified a hostile interpretation": pursuant to a treaty with Spain, Louis occupied several towns in the Spanish Netherlands (modern Belgium and Nord-Pas-de-Calais). This was the spark that ignited the powder keg created by the unresolved issues of the War of the League of Augsburg (1689–1697) and the acceptance of the Spanish inheritance by Louis XIV for his grandson.

Almost immediately the War of the Spanish Succession began. Concern among other European powers that Spain and France united under a single Bourbon monarch would upset the balance of power pitted France and Spain against the Grand Alliance of England, the Netherlands and Austria.

Inside Spain, the Crown of Castile supported Philip of France. On the other hand, the majority of the nobility of the Crown of Aragon supported Charles of Austria, son of Holy Roman Emperor Leopold I and claimant to the Spanish throne by right of his grandmother Maria Anna of Spain. Charles was even hailed as King of Aragon under the name Charles III.

The war was centred in Spain and west-central Europe (especially the Low Countries), with other important fighting in Germany and Italy. Prince Eugene of Savoy and the Duke of Marlborough distinguished themselves as military commanders in the Low Countries. In colonial North America, the conflict became known to the English colonists who fought against French and Spanish forces as Queen Anne's War. Over the course of the fighting, some 400,000 people were killed.

It was with this war as a backdrop that, beginning in 1707, Philip issued the Nueva Planta decrees, which centralized Spanish rule under the Castilian political and administrative model and in the process abolished the charters of all independently administered kingdoms within Spain—most notably the Crown of Aragon, which was supporting Charles VI in the conflict—except for the Kingdom of Navarre and the rest of the Basque region, who had supported Philip in the war for the Spanish throne, and retained their semi-autonomous self-government. The policy of centralization had as model the French State under Louis XIV and was strongly supported by politicians such as Joseph de Solís and the Sardinian political philosopher Vicente Bacallar.

At one point in 1712 Philip was offered the choice of renouncing the throne of Spain so that he could be made heir of France, but he refused.

Philip decided to relinquish his right of succession to France under one condition: the introduction of semi-Salic law in Spain. Under this law, the succession to the Spanish crown was limited to his entire male line before it could pass to any female, a condition of his renunciation made clear to the allies during the preliminaries of the Treaties of Utrecht. It was not until this was successfully accomplished (10 May 1713) that Spain and Great Britain made their own peace terms at the second Treaty of Utrecht (annexing the new law to the Treaty). By the terms of the Treaty of Utrecht that concluded the war, Philip was recognized as king of Spain but Spain was forced to cede Menorca and Gibraltar to Great Britain; the Spanish Netherlands, Naples, Milan, and Sicily to the Austrian Habsburgs; and Sardinia and parts of Milan to Savoy.

These losses greatly diminished the Spanish Empire in Europe, which had already been in decline. Throughout his reign, Philip sought to reverse the decline of Spanish power. Trying to overturn the terms of the Treaty of Utrecht, he attempted to re-establish Spanish claims in Italy, triggering the War of the Quadruple Alliance (1718–1720) in which Spain fought a coalition of four major powers. Phillip V was forced to sue for peace.

Second marriage
Shortly after the death of Queen Maria Luisa in 1714, the King decided to marry again. His second wife was Elisabeth of Parma, daughter of Odoardo Farnese, Hereditary Prince of Parma, and Dorothea Sophie of the Palatinate. At the age of 22, on 24 December 1714, she was married to the 31-year-old Philip by proxy in Parma. The marriage was arranged by Cardinal Alberoni, with the concurrence of the Princesse des Ursins, the Camarera mayor de Palacio ("chief of the household") of the king of Spain.

Abdication

On 14 January 1724, Philip abdicated the throne to his eldest son, the seventeen-year-old Louis, for reasons still subject to debate. One theory suggests that Philip V, who exhibited many elements of mental instability during his reign, did not wish to reign due to his increasing mental decline. A second theory puts the abdication in context of the Bourbon dynasty. The French royal family recently had lost many legitimate agnates to diseases. Indeed, Philip V's abdication occurred just over a month after the death of the Duke of Orléans, who had been regent for Louis XV of France. The lack of an heir made another continental war of succession a possibility. Philip V was a legitimate descendant of Louis XIV, but matters were complicated by the Treaty of Utrecht, which forbade a union of the French and Spanish crowns. The theory supposes that Philip V hoped that by abdicating the Spanish crown he could circumvent the Treaty and succeed to the French throne.

In any case, Louis died on 31 August 1724 in Madrid of smallpox, having reigned only seven months and leaving no issue. Philip was forced to return to the Spanish throne in 1724.

Later reign

Philip helped his Bourbon relatives to make territorial gains in the War of the Polish Succession and the War of the Austrian Succession by reconquering Naples and Sicily from Austria and Oran from the Ottomans. Finally, at the end of his reign Spanish forces also successfully defended their American territories from a large British invasion during the War of Jenkins' Ear (1739–1748).

During Philip's reign, Spain began to recover from the stagnation it had suffered during the twilight of the Spanish Habsburg dynasty. Although the population of Spain grew, the financial and taxation systems were archaic and the treasury ran deficits. The king employed thousands of highly paid retainers at his palaces—not to assist with ruling the country but to look after the royal family.  Meanwhile, the army and bureaucracy went months without pay.  It was only the shipments of silver from the New World which kept the system going. Spain suspended payments on its debt in 1739 — effectively declaring bankruptcy.

Death
Philip experienced bouts of manic depression and increasingly fell victim to a deep melancholia. His second wife, Elizabeth Farnese, completely dominated her passive husband. She bore him further sons, including another successor, Charles III of Spain. Beginning in August 1737 his mental illness was eased by the castrato singer Farinelli, who became the "Musico de Camara of Their Majesties." Farinelli would sing eight or nine arias for the king and queen every night, usually with a trio of musicians.

Philip died on 9 July 1746 in El Escorial, in Madrid, but was buried in his favorite Royal Palace of La Granja de San Ildefonso, near Segovia. Ferdinand VI of Spain, his son by his first queen Maria Luisa of Savoy, succeeded him.

Legacy

Historians have generally been unkind to the king. Lynch says Philip V advanced the government only marginally over that of his predecessors and was more of a liability than Charles II. When a conflict came up between the interests of Spain and France, he usually favored France. However, Philip did make some reforms in government, and strengthened the central authorities relative to the provinces. Merit became more important, although most senior positions still went to the landed aristocracy. Below the elite level, the inefficiency and corruption that had existed under Charles II was as widespread as ever. The reforms started by Philip V culminated in much more important reforms of Charles III. The economy, on the whole, improved over the previous half-century, with greater productivity, and fewer famines and epidemics.   The government promoted industry, agriculture and shipbuilding. After the destruction of the main silver fleet at Vigo in 1702, the navy was rebuilt. Nevertheless, the new fleet was still too small to support the vast worldwide empire.

To commemorate the indignities the city of Xàtiva suffered after Philip's victory in the Battle of Almansa in the War of the Spanish Succession, in which he ordered the city to be burned and renamed San Felipe, the portrait of the monarch hangs upside down in the local museum of L'Almodí.

The province of the New Philippines, which occupied parts of what is now Texas in the United States, was named in 1716 in honor of Philip.

Philip V favored and promoted the Atlantic trade of Spain with its American possessions. During this Atlantic trade emerged important figures of the naval history of Spain, among which stands out the corsair Amaro Pargo. Philip V frequently benefited the corsair in his commercial incursions: he granted a Royal order given at the Royal Palace of El Pardo in Madrid in September 1714, in which he appointed him captain of a commercial ship bound for Caracas. The Monarch also interceded in the liberation of Amaro during his detention by the Casa de Contratación of Cádiz and authorized him to build a ship bound for Campeche, which was armed like a corsair ship.

Issue
Philip married his double-second cousin Maria Luisa of Savoy (17 September 1688 – 14 February 1714) on 3 November 1701 and they had 4 sons:

Louis I of Spain (25 August 1707 – 31 August 1724) married Louise Élisabeth d'Orléans but had no children. 
Philip (2 July 1709 – 18 July 1709) died young. 
Infante Philip of Spain (7 June 1712 – 29 December 1719) died young. 
Ferdinand VI of Spain (23 September 1713 – 10 August 1759) married Barbara of Portugal but had no children.

Philip married Elisabeth Farnese (25 October 1692 – 11 July 1766) on 24 December 1714, they had 6 children:
Charles III of Spain (20 January 1716 – 14 December 1788) married Maria Amalia of Saxony and had children. 
Infanta Mariana Victoria of Spain (31 March 1718 – 15 January 1781) married King Joseph I of Portugal and had children. 
Infante Philip of Spain (15 March 1720 – 18 July 1765) Duke of Parma and founder of the line of Bourbons of Parma married Louise Élisabeth of France and had children. 
Infanta Maria Teresa of Spain (11 June 1726 – 22 July 1746) married Louis of France, Dauphin of France and had children. 
Infante Louis of Spain (25 July 1727 – 7 August 1785), known as the Cardinal Infante. Was Archbishop of Toledo, Primate of Spain and Cardinal since 1735. In 1754, renounced his ecclesiastical titles and became Count of Chinchón. In 1776, he married morganatically María Teresa de Vallabriga and had children, but without royal titles.
Infanta Maria Antonia of Spain (17 November 1729 – 19 September 1785) married Victor Amadeus III of Sardinia and had children.

Ancestry

Coins

Heraldry

See also
Nueva Planta decrees 
Royal Madrilenian Academy of Medicine

References

Further reading 
 
 Jones Corredera, Edward. "The memory of the Habsburg Monarchy in early eighteenth-century Spain." Global Intellectual History (2018): 1-20.

 Lynch, John. Bourbon Spain 1700–1808 (1989)
 Pearce, Adrian J. "Bourbon Rule and the Origins of Reform in Spain and the Colonies, 1700 to 1719." in The Origins of Bourbon Reform in Spanish South America, 1700–1763 (Palgrave Macmillan,  2014) pp. 43–62.
 
 Storrs, Christopher. "The Spanish Risorgimento in the Western Mediterranean and Italy 1707–1748." European History Quarterly 42.4 (2012): 555–577.
 "Philip, V (1683-1746)." in Encyclopedia of World Biography (Gale, 1998).Online

External links 
 

|-

|-

|-

1683 births
1746 deaths
17th-century Spanish monarchs
18th-century Spanish monarchs
17th-century Aragonese monarchs
18th-century Aragonese monarchs
18th-century kings of Sardinia
17th-century Kings of Sicily
18th-century Kings of Sicily
17th-century monarchs of Naples
18th-century monarchs of Naples
17th-century Navarrese monarchs
18th-century Navarrese monarchs
Dukes of Anjou
Dukes of Brabant
Dukes of Burgundy
Dukes of Milan
Grand Masters of the Order of the Golden Fleece
House of Bourbon (Spain)
Knights of Santiago
Knights of the Golden Fleece of Spain
Monarchs who abdicated
People from Versailles
Princes of France (Bourbon)
People with mood disorders
17th-century peers of France